End of an Error is the second studio album released by DeathBoy. A successor to DeathBoy's debut release Music to Crash Cars To, End of an Error was a much more polished release. The second track in the album, Black Morning, was used in the Xbox 360 game Project Gotham Racing 3.

Track listing 
 Amphetamine Zoo
 Black Morning
 Money and Confidence
 Slip
 Smile You Fuckers
 Lullaby
 Cheap Shot
 Playing Grownup
 Something
 Angel on my Shoulder
 Caustic

References

External links 
 DeathBoy official site

DeathBoy albums
2007 albums
Albums produced by John Fryer (producer)